Akura may refer to several places:

 Akura, India
 Akura, Georgia